Bayview Cemetery, previously called Greenville Cemetery, is located in Jersey City, New Jersey. It merged with New York Bay Cemetery and is now known as Bayview – New York Bay Cemetery.

History
The cemetery was built in 1848. It is located in the Greenville Section near Danforth Avenue Station. A former turnpike, the Bergen Point Plank Road, now Garfield Avenue, runs through the cemetery.

The cemetery contains a memorial and plots of several employees of the Cunard Shipping Line. Ziegler served as president of the Cemetery, from 1935 to 1957.

The cemetery contains a section which is an early Jewish burial ground, unique to Hudson County.

Notable burials
 Paul Broeser.
 Mary Antoinette Brown-Sherman (1926–2004), Liberian university president
 Glenn Dale Cunningham (1943–2004), Mayor of Jersey City
 William Davis Daly (1851–1900), represented New Jersey's 7th congressional district from 1899 to 1900.
 Edward Irving Edwards (1863–1931) Governor of New Jersey.
 George Bragg Fielder (1842–1906), American Civil War veteran and politician
 Edward Hoos (1850–1912), Mayor of Jersey City.
 James W. McCarthy (d. 1872), first Jersey City Fire Department firefighter to die in the line of duty
 Arthur Harry Moore (1879–1952), 39th Governor of New Jersey who served three separate terms as governor between 1926 and 1941.
 Lillian Nordica (1857–1914), American opera singer
 George Lawrence Record (1859–1933), lawyer
 Joe Simmons (1845–1901), buried under his birth name of Joseph S. Chabriel, was a Major league baseball player and manager.
 Robert G. Smith (1854–1923), American colonel and politician
 Edward Faitoute Condict Young (1835–1908), banker, manufacturer and politician.
 One Commonwealth war grave, of a World War I seaman of the Royal Naval Volunteer Reserve.

See also
 2019 Jersey City shooting
 Hudson County Cemeteries

References

External links 
 Bayview – New York Bay Cemetery at Cemetery Junction
 Bayview – New York Bay Cemetery at The Political Graveyard
 
 Bayview – New York Bay Cemetery at Grave Info

Cemeteries in Hudson County, New Jersey
Buildings and structures in Jersey City, New Jersey
1848 establishments in New Jersey